Karşıyaka Women's Volleyball Team is a Turkish women's volleyball department of Karşıyaka SK, a major sports club based in Karşıyaka, İzmir. This team play their matches at the 6500-seated Karşıyaka Arena.

History
The team was founded and has been promoted to Turkish First League in the 1982. The team finished the Turkish First League as 3rd in 2006-07 season. It was biggest success in the club history. The team relegated from Turkish First League in the 2010-11 season for the first time in its history. The team still plays in the Turkish Second League.

Current roster
''As of October 2020.

| Melis Alpacar Demir
|Libero

See also
Karşıyaka SK

External links
 Turkish Volleyball Federation official website 

Women's volleyball teams in Turkey
1912 establishments in the Ottoman Empire